Drienovec is a village and municipality in Košice-okolie District in the Kosice Region of eastern Slovakia.

History
In historical records the village was first mentioned in 1335.

Geography
The village lies at an altitude of 190 metres and covers an area of 28.70 km². It has a population of about 1840 people.

Genealogical resources

The records for genealogical research are available at the state archive "Statny Archiv in Kosice, Slovakia"

 Roman Catholic church records (births/marriages/deaths): 1859-1891 (parish A)
 Reformated church records (births/marriages/deaths): 1727-1904 (parish B)

See also
 List of municipalities and towns in Slovakia

External links

Literatura
Surnames of living people in Drienovec

Villages and municipalities in Košice-okolie District